The Agricultural Bank of Iceland (Icelandic: Búnaðarbanki Íslands, or simply Búnaðarbankinn) was an Icelandic bank. It was promulgated by the Icelandic Parliament in 1929 and started operation a year later. In 2002 it was privatized and merged with Kaupthing Bank the following year.

References

Banks of Iceland
Banks established in 1930